Legislative elections were held in France between 8 and 22 May 1815 for the period of the Hundred Days. The elections were held to appoint deputies to the Chamber of Representatives established by the Additional Charter of 22 April 1815. The elections were the first since April 1799 and last of the 'republican system' until the Charter of 1830.

Background
After his return from the Isle of Elba and his entry into Paris on March 20, 1815, Napoleon Bonaparte returned to the throne.  Aware that most of the French no longer want the authoritarian regime established in Year VIII and desirous of making the Bourbons completely forgotten, the Emperor resolves to liberalise the regime.  For this, he had a new constitution drafted by Benjamin Constant, the Act additional to the constitutions of the Empire, which took up a good part of the liberal elements of the Charter of 1814.

This act overhauls the Parliament which is divided into two chambers: the Chamber of Peers , made up of hereditary peers appointed by the Emperor, and the Chamber of Representatives which is elected by census suffrage.

In the system established by the Charter of 1815, each district or department formed an 'electoral college'.  The college would provide the framework of the elections in France for the next 100 years and continues in a similar fashion today.  Each college would table the votes achieves by those who voted (any man of 25 years or older who paid taxes could vote).

There were 13 further 'special districts' established also known as arrondissements, between which the votes are equally divided according to a second table.  These special districts represented certain areas of high concentrations of essential workers, like merchants, shipowners, bankers, etc.  The electoral system therefore left 629 representatives from the departments, and 23 of which were from these special districts.

The Additional Act was ratified by plebiscite on 1 June, but with a very large abstention.  Indeed, this new constitution does not satisfy many people. If the royalists are obviously hostile to it, the Liberals and republicans find it too conservative. The liberal bourgeoisie criticizes the text in particular for not leaving enough initiative to the representatives in legislative matters.

Results
In order to elect the Chamber of Representatives, the electoral colleges were convened for 8 May 1815, when Napoleon could very well have postponed the election in view of the international situation. Thus the constitution comes into force even before the people have spoken about it. Under these conditions, voter turnout was very low: in 67 departments out of 87, the colleges were unable to achieve the 50%+1 turnout that the law required. Overall turnout was 37% in the departments (7,538 of 20,431 electors) and 45% in the arrondisements (32,538 of 72,199 electors). In Marseille, a city where the bourgeoisie was royalist, just thirteen electors choose four deputies.

References

France 1
Legislative
1815 05